Grigoriy Moiseevich Sandler (Russian: Сандлер, Григорий Моисеевич; village of Ostrovno, Sennensky Uyezd, Mogilev Governorate, 21 August 1912 - St. Petersburg, 1994) was a Soviet choral conductor. He was conductor of the Leningrad State University Students' Choir, founded 1949, for 45 years.

Selected discography
 Shostakovich Ten Poems on Texts by Revolutionary Poets, Op. 88, 1951. Sviridov 7 Choruses. Leningrad Radio and TV Chorus, Grigori Sandler

References

1912 births
1994 deaths
People from Beshankovichy District
People from Sennensky Uyezd
Belarusian Jews
Soviet conductors (music)
20th-century conductors (music)
Soviet military personnel of World War II